Shadow Hills High School is a public high school for grades 9–12. It is located in north Indio, California, United States.

Other high schools in the area are Indio High School, La Quinta High School and Palm Desert High School. The main feeder school are Indio Middle School and Desert Ridge Academy which replaced the former Woodrow Wilson Middle School in 2009.

History
Shadow Hills High School opened on August 31, 2009, with about 600 freshman and sophomore students. The high school is the fourth in the Desert Sands Unified School District.

Shadow Hills has 84 classrooms, a 400-seat performing arts theater, an 80-seat lecture hall and a three-court gymnasium.

In July 2012, Marcus Wood, the former principal of John Glenn Middle School in Desert Sands Unified, succeeded the recently retired Doug Bluth as the school's second principal.

One year after earning his Ed.D., Dr. Wood was promoted to Senior Director of Curriculum, Instruction, and Assessment at the district office. Former SHHS Assistant Principal Gabriel P. Fajardo was hired before the 2017/2018 school year to fill the vacant principal position.

Shadow Hills High School athletics compete in the Desert Empire League.

Performing arts
The Regiment of the Realm, the Shadow Hills High School marching band, first received global recognition after having participated at the Coachella Valley Music and Arts Festival on April 13 and 20 alongside the group Big Gigantic. With 34 local marching band students, the Regiment of the Realm performed a remix of "Can't Hold Us" and "I Need A Dollar" with Big Gigantic and gained local fame for their performance at one of the biggest music festivals in the world.

In 2015, the Regiment of the Realm was featured in the One Direction music video for "Steal My Girl".  On September 30, 40 band members were driven to a local national park in Southern California, where the music video was filmed in the morning until early evening.

Recently, the Regiment was recruited to perform live on the set of composer Lisa Bielawa's new series titled Vireo: The Spiritual Biography of a Witch's Accuser, an episodic opera featured on KCET.

Royal Voices in Harmony, the school's choir program, is directed by Kaylon Mcgee. The program consists of 3 choirs: mixed choir, which is open to any students with no audition, Bella Voce, a women's ensemble available for 10–12 graders with a required audition, and Chamber Singers, a choir for 10–12 graders with a required audition. The Chambers and Bellas have participated in many competitions at places like Disneyland and Carnegie Hall. The choirs recently both placed at the Form music festival in Anaheim, California. The Chamber Singers placed third and the Bella Voce placed second, landing them both a Gold rating, meaning they are both invited back for the judges invitational next year.

Notable alumni
  – Texas Rangers pitcher
  – Los Angeles Angels infielder

References

External links
 
 DSUSD School District.ca: Shadow Hills High School boundaries

High schools in Riverside County, California
Indio, California
Public high schools in California
2009 establishments in California
Educational institutions established in 2009